DAP is a Chilean airline that operates charter and schedule flights, with its base in Punta Arenas, Chile. The DAP group is a consortium formed by Aerovías DAP, AeroRescate, Antarctic Airways, DAP Antarctica, DAP Helicópteros and Mineral Airways.

History 

The airline was established in 1980 and is wholly owned by the Pivcevic family. "DAP" is the acronym of its creator, Domingo Andrés Pivcevic, a Punta Arenas businessman. Its first flight was with a de Havilland Canada DHC-6 Twin Otter that to this day flies with the company.

After visualizing the need for air transport in the area of Magallanes, the company acquired a Piper PA-31 Navajo that it employed for a couple years, before replaced it with two Cessna 402 units and a Beechcraft King Air 100. Its first operations were between Punta Arenas, Porvenir, Puerto Williams and Puerto Natales, with some charter operations to other cities of Chilean and Argentinean Patagonia.

At the beginning of the 1990s, the company flew from Punta Arenas to Falkland Islands, for which it soon incorporated two Boeing 727-100 units that operated the Santiago-Punta Arenas-Mount Pleasant route. However, the three large commercial airlines in Chile (LAN Chile, Ladeco and National Airlines) worked together to bring prices down to fight the competition established by DAP, which finally retired from the market, filing a lawsuit citing unloyal competition. In 2007, DAP was paid a legal compensation by the offending airlines.

In over 36 years of continuous operation, DAP has not registered any accidents that put to risk life or limb of any passengers, including over 100.000 flight hours by its helicopter company DAP Helicópteros.

Flying to Antarctica 

Another of the air routes operated by Aerovías DAP is the flight from Punta Arenas to Presidente Eduardo Frei Montalva base, located at aerodrome Teniente Rodolfo Marsh, in King George Island, on the Antarctic territory claimed by Chile. The first flight to Antarctica took place on February 12, 1989 on the Twin Otter, later incorporating a King Air 100 for this operation. Starting in 2003, two de Havilland Canada DHC-7 aircraft were leased for this summer operation. These airplanes flew to Antarctica as well as being employed in other routes DAP held in Patagonia at the time.

In 2007, the airline leased a BAe 146-200 that was operated by the British company Flightline. This plane began flying to Antarctica with DAP in early 2008.

Currently, through its brand Antarctic Airways, DAP carries out 76% of all air traffic between Antarctica and America, using two BAe 146-200 and a King Air 300.

Destinations

Fleet 

The Aerovías DAP fleet includes the following aircraft:

3 Avro RJ100 (as of August 2019)
2 Avro RJ85 (as of August 2019)
1 British Aerospace 146-100 
3 British Aerospace 146-200 (as of August 2018)
1 De Havilland Canada DHC-6 Twin Otter Series 300 (as of August 2019)
1 CASA 212-100 (stored)
2 Cessna 402C
1 Beechcraft King Air 100
1 Beechchcraft King Air 300

DAP Helicópteros fleet comprises:
4 Eurocopter AS355F TwinStar
5 Eurocopter BO105CB4
4 Eurocopter BO105CBS
1 Eurocopter EC135T1 (incorporated May 2007)
1 Eurocopter AS350B3

External links
Aerovías DAP
AeroRescate 
DAP Helicopteros

See also
Air ambulance

References

Airlines of Chile
Airlines established in 1979
Chilean companies established in 1979